Chauvigny (Poitevin: Chôvigni) is a commune in the Vienne department in the Nouvelle-Aquitaine region in western France.

The town is situated overlooking the river Vienne and a small brook. Chauvigny is twinned with Billericay in Essex, England.

The composer Fernand Lamy (1881–1966) was born in Chauvigny. 

Chauvigny was among the places visited by Roger Fry the British artist, art critic and member of the Bloomsbury group in October 1911 when, after his visit to Paris to see the Salon d’Automne, he joined Clive Bell (husband of the celebrated English artist Vanessa Bell) and Duncan Grant (also a celebrated English artist) on a bicycle tour of the region to explore Romanesque churches. Fry produced a charming painting of Chauvigny

Population

Sights
Chauvigny features two interesting Romanesque churches, both restored in the 19th century. There are also ruins of a château of the bishops of Poitiers and of several other strongholds.

Near Chauvigny is the curious bone-cavern of Jioux, the entrance to which is fortified by large blocks of stone.

Economy
As of 1911, the town carried on lime-burning and plaster-manufacture, and there were stone quarries in the vicinity. Trade was in wool and feathers.

See also
Communes of the Vienne department

References

External links

 Official site
 Tourism
 Philosophical Society
  Spectacle animalier: Les géants du Ciel
 Flying club
 IREO - Institut de Formation de Chauvigny
 Shooting club
 Romanes.com
  Aerial views

Communes of Vienne